Lothar Kleim (born 27 October 1936) is a German former football player and manager who played as a midfielder.

References

1936 births
Living people
German footballers
Association football midfielders
FC Schalke 04 players
KSV Hessen Kassel players
SV Eintracht Trier 05 players
Union Luxembourg players
German football managers
SV Eintracht Trier 05 managers
SpVgg Greuther Fürth managers
SV Darmstadt 98 managers
German expatriate footballers
German expatriate sportspeople in Luxembourg
Expatriate footballers in Luxembourg